Vegard Kongsro (born 7 August 1998) is a Norwegian footballer who plays as a defender for HamKam.

Career
Kongsro played youth football at Eidanger and Odd, before starting his senior career with Pors in 2017. After two seasons with Pors, he moved to Ull/Kisa in 2019, where he spent another two seasons. In March 2021, he signed a four-year contract with Bodø/Glimt. On 27 June 2021, he made his Eliteserien debut in a 4–1 win against Stabæk. In March 2022, he joined HamKam on a three-year contract.

References

External links

1998 births
Living people
Sportspeople from Porsgrunn
Association football defenders
Norwegian footballers
Norway youth international footballers
Odds BK players
Pors Grenland players
Ullensaker/Kisa IL players
FK Bodø/Glimt players
Hamarkameratene players
Norwegian Third Division players
Norwegian Second Division players
Norwegian First Division players
Eliteserien players